Ampere is the provisional name of a proposed electric vehicle and software company to be spun off from Groupe Renault as part of the third phase of its "Renaulution" recovery plan. In such plan, Ampere is set to develop and supply vehicles, initially for Renault.

Announced on November 8, 2022, Ampere is part of Luca de Meo's "reinvention" plans, which see the company shift its focus to become what he calls "a next-generation car company".

By developing Ampere as its own entity, Groupe Renault says it is creating "the first pure EV and software player born from an OEM disruption". Renault plans to list the company on the Paris stock exchange from the second half of 2023, retaining a majority stake.

Proposed models

In production
 Renault Mégane E-Tech Electric (2022–present)

Future
 Renault 5 EV (2024)
 Renault 4 EV (2025), previewed by the 4Ever Trophy concept
 Renault Scénic Vision (2024)
 two further new EVs

References

Vehicle manufacturing companies